The Durgavati Express is a weekly Express train service run by West Central Railway, It runs between Jabalpur Junction railway station of Jabalpur, a military hub of Eastern Madhya Pradesh state and  Katra railway station of Jammu & Kashmir in India.

It operates as train number 11449 from Jabalpur Junction to Shri Mata Vaishno Devi Katra and as train number 11450 in the reverse direction, serving the states of Madhya Pradesh, Uttar Pradesh, Haryana, Delhi, Punjab and Jammu and Kashmir.

Background
The name Durgavati Express was given in the memory of the princess of the Mahakoshal region in Jabalpur named Princess Durgavati (Rani Durgavati).

Coach composition
The train consists of 23 coaches: 2 AC II tier, four AC III tier, 10 sleeper, three Unreserved Coaches, and 2 luggage/brake vans. It carries a pantry car.

Routing

Traction

References

External links
11449 Durgavati Express at India Rail Info
11450 Durgavati Express at India Rail Info

Transport in Katra, Jammu and Kashmir
Transport in Jabalpur
Named passenger trains of India
Rail transport in Uttar Pradesh
Rail transport in Madhya Pradesh
Rail transport in Haryana
Rail transport in Punjab, India
Rail transport in Delhi
Rail transport in Jammu and Kashmir
Express trains in India